WMFJ is a radio station broadcasting on 1450 kHz, which is licensed to Daytona Beach, Florida. The station is owned by Cornerstone Broadcasting Corporation, and airs a Christian talk and teaching format.

History
The station began broadcasting April 16, 1935, and originally broadcast at 1420 kHz. The station moved to 1450 kHz in March 1941, as a result of the North American Regional Broadcasting Agreement. The station aired a contemporary hits format in the 1960s and 1970s. The station adopted a religious format in the early 1980s. In February 1996, the station was purchased by Cornerstone Broadcasting.

References

External links 
WMFJ's website

FCC History Cards for WMFJ

MFJ
Radio stations established in 1935
1935 establishments in Florida